Javier de Viana is a town in the Artigas Department of northern Uruguay. It was named after the Uruguayan writer Javier de Viana.

Geography

Population
In 2011 Javier de Viana had a population of 140.
 
Source: Instituto Nacional de Estadística de Uruguay

References

External links
INE map of Javier de Viana

Populated places in the Artigas Department